Wast is a sub-district located in Harf Sufyan District, 'Amran Governorate, Yemen. Wast had a population of 2729 according to the 2004 census.

References 

Sub-districts in Harf Sufyan District